Diego Luis Bossio (born September 9, 1979) is an Argentine economist and politician. He was executive director of ANSES, the national social insurance agency, from 2009 to 2015. Bossio also served as National Deputy for Buenos Aires Province, from 2015 to 2019.

Early life and career
Bossio was born in Tandil, Buenos Aires Province. He enrolled at the University of Buenos Aires, and earned a degree in Economics in 2002. He married the former Valeria Loria, and they had one daughter. He joined the Fundación Contemporánea, a think tank, and was brought on by economist Aldo Abraham as a member of his Exante consulting firm. He later served as policy adviser to Mendoza Senator Celso Jaque. Bossio entered public service as the Secretary of Public Management, a key policy advisory position, to Jaque upon the latter's election as governor in 2007.

Political career
He was appointed director of the Mendoza office of the Mortgage Bank, and on January 5, 2009, was named as the government's representative in the Board of Directors at the bank, a private-public partnership. Following a cabinet shakeup in July, Bossio succeeded the executive director of ANSES, Amado Boudou; Boudou was appointed Economy Minister. Bossio's wife had worked as an adviser to Senator Cristina Fernández de Kirchner before the latter's election as President of Argentina in 2007, and was subsequently appointed Adjunct Director of SIGEN, the federal comptroller's agency. Bossio's appointment as director of ANSES, which controls nearly a third of the national budget, prompted her resignation, however.

Bossio's tenure at ANSES coincided with a number of significant new initiatives at the social insurance bureau. He oversaw implementation of the Universal Childhood Entitlement, a program fostering vaccination and higher school enrollment among the 30% of children living in poverty; as well as Conectar Igualdad, which purchased 3 million netbooks for secondary school students and teachers; and an initiative announced in April 2011 to include ANSES members in the Board of Directors of all 42 companies on the Buenos Aires Stock Exchange in which it holds a significant stake. Directors from the 15 companies affected (27 already had an ANSES board member) varied in their reaction to the initiative, from Banco Macro (which accepted the move), to Siderar (which entered into litigation with ANSES).

Electoral history

References

External links

ANSES

1979 births
Living people
People from Tandil
Argentine people of Italian descent
University of Buenos Aires alumni
Argentine economists
Members of the Argentine Chamber of Deputies elected in Buenos Aires Province